Zer or ZER may refer to:
 Zer or Tser (צֵר), name of a city of the Naphtalites in Joshua 19:35
 Zer, the name of the letter zayn (ز) in the Urdu alphabet
 Djer, the third pharaoh of the First Dynasty of Egypt
 Zer (film), a 2017 film by Kazim Öz
 Schuylkill County Airport, the IATA code for the airport in the United States
 Zero Airport, the IATA code for the airport in India